Parish of Warruera, New South Wales Located at , six Kilometers north of Wanaaring, New South Wales is a cadastral parish of Ularara County New South Wales.

History
The parish is on the Paroo River and the traditional lands of the Paaruntyi people. 
The Burke and Wills expedition were the first Europeans to the area, passing a few miles to the west.

Climate 

The climate is semi-arid, featuring low rainfall, very hot summer temperatures and cool nights in winter. 
 The parish has a Köppen climate classification of BWh (Hot desert).

References

Parishes of Ularara County
Far West (New South Wales)